Dragon Fire is a 1993 martial arts film set in a dystopian Los Angeles in the year 2050. It is notable for heavily using actual kickboxing champions for the actors.

Cast
 Dominick LaBanca as Laker Powers
 Pamela Pond as Marta
 Kisu as Slick
 Harold Hazeldine as Eddie
 Charles Philip Moore as Low-Ball
 Michael Blanks as Ahmed Mustafa
 Dennis Keiffer as Johnny Powers
 Roy Boesch as Official
 Manuel Luben as Manolo
 Randall Shiro Ideishi as Li (as Randy Ideishi)
 Richard Fuller as Hulk
 John Arthur as Black Ice
 Val Mijailovic as Morales
 Rae Manzon as Kemal
 Laura Neustedter as Woman Fighter
 Carolyn Raimondi as Woman Fighter
 Marc Wilder as Waheed
 Deon Edwards as Rankin

External links 
 

1993 films
1993 martial arts films
Dystopian films
Martial arts tournament films
Kickboxing films
Martial arts science fiction films
1990s science fiction films
Films set in 2050
1990s English-language films
Films directed by Rick Jacobson